The 2017 Emirates Melbourne Cup was the 157th running of the Melbourne Cup, a prestigious Australian Thoroughbred horse race.

The race was won by Rekindling, ridden by Corey Brown and trained by Joseph O'Brien. Johannes Vermeer finished second and Max Dynamite was third.

Field

See also
 List of Melbourne Cup winners
 List of Melbourne Cup placings

References

2017
Melbourne Cup
2010s in Melbourne
Melbourne Cup